Henry Ivison Shipley Thirlaway (9 August 1917 – 30 November 2009) was a British seismologist. He did extensive work on the monitoring of underground nuclear testing. He was awarded the Gold Medal of the Royal Astronomical Society in 1972.

External links
Hal Thirlaway: seismologist Times Online  obituary
Hal Thirlaway obituary from the Guardiian

1917 births
2009 deaths
Recipients of the Gold Medal of the Royal Astronomical Society
British seismologists